Willow Bunch was a federal electoral district in Saskatchewan, Canada, that was represented in the House of Commons of Canada from 1925 to 1935.

This riding was created in 1924 from parts of Maple Creek, Moose Jaw and Swift Current  ridings

It was abolished in 1933 when it was redistributed into Moose Jaw, Swift Current and Wood Mountain ridings.

Election results

See also 

 List of Canadian federal electoral districts
 Past Canadian electoral districts

External links 

Former federal electoral districts of Saskatchewan